Arthonia ilicinella is a species of lichen belonging to the family Arthoniaceae.

It is native to Western Europe.

References

Arthoniomycetes
Lichen species
Lichens of Europe
Taxa named by William Nylander (botanist)
Lichens described in 1867